Avoca railway station served the town of Avoca in County Wicklow. The station was known as Ovoca until 1912. It opened on 18 July 1863 and was closed on 30 March 1964 except for special excursions.

References

Railway stations in County Wicklow
Buildings and structures in County Wicklow
Railway stations opened in 1863
Railway stations closed in 1964
Disused railway stations in County Wicklow